The Division I AHCA All-American Teams are an annual honor bestowed by the American Hockey Coaches Association to the college hockey players judged to be the top performers in their division. Each team is composed of at least one goaltender, two defensemen and three forwards on ice hockey programs. At least one all-star team has been named by the since the start of NCAA tournament play in 1947–48 after the conclusion of either the regular season or the conference tournaments.

Initially the All-American teams weren't named by ACHA. in the first ten years of the teams the players were selected by some combination of media members and team officials. In some years only players from teams that participated in the NCAA tournament were eligible. In each of the first ten years two teams worth of players were voted on and usually assorted into a first- and second-team. In some years, however, no distinction was made and the players were all considered to have received first-team honors. The format was changed for the 1957–58 season, creating an All-American team for both the East and West regions. In the early years of this format the All-American teams were dominated by two conferences (the WCHA in the west and the ECAC in the east) as there were only two major conferences competing in NCAA hockey (the WCHA began play in 1959–60 followed by the ECAC two years later). While the CCHA began play in 1971–72 it would only provide one player to the All-American teams until a conference realignment in 1981–82 when it became considered on par with the major conferences. The ECAC would continue to dominate the eastern teams until an internal schism split the conference and Hockey East was formed in 1984–85. Due in part to an influx of member teams to fill the rolls of the four major conferences as well as increased inter-conference competition for recognition, the AHCA began to name two teams for each region (first- and second-teams) which it has continued to do since 1983–84.

As of 2013–14 the conferences that comprise the east region are Atlantic Hockey, the ECAC and Hockey East while the western region contains the Big Ten, NCHC and the WCHA.

All-American teams

First Team

1940s

1950s

1960s

1970s

1980s

1990s

2000s

2010s

2020s

First Team players by school

Multiple appearances

Second Team

1940s

1950s

1980s

1990s

2000s

2010s

2020s

Second Team players by school

Multiple appearances

References

External links
List of All-Americans
USCHO.com
College Hockey Historical Archives

Teams
College ice hockey trophies and awards in the United States